The 2020–21 Belgian Basketball Cup, for sponsorship reasons the Euromillions Cup, was the 67th edition of Belgium's national basketball cup tournament. Antwerp Giants were the defending champions, but lost the quarter-finals against Oostende, who would go on to win the Cup outright.

On 2 July 2020, a new format and draw were announced by the EuroMillions League. Six teams from the Top Division Men, the national second division, were joined by all Pro Basketball League (PBL) teams for a group stage. The format was changed again in December 2020, due to the COVID-19 pandemic. The competition returned to its former format with only PBL teams. The final was played on 21 March in Palais 12.

Games

Bracket

Final

See also
2020–21 Pro Basketball League

References

Belgian Basketball Cup
Cup